Kathleen Mary Easmon Simango (9 August 1891 – 20 July 1924) was a Sierra Leonean missionary and artist who was the first West African to earn a diploma from the Royal College of Arts. She was the niece of Adelaide Casely-Hayford and was a personal friend of Samuel Coleridge-Taylor. Simango was also a member of the prominent Sierra Leone Creole Easmon family.

Early years and education

Kathleen Mary Easmon was born on 9 August 1891 as the younger of two children in Accra, Gold Coast (present-day Ghana), to Dr John Farrell Easmon and Annette Kathleen Easmon, née Smith. Kathleen was educated at Slaford House School, then Notting Hill High School from 1903 to 1907, then the Girls' Modern School, Bedford, from 1907 to 1908, and finally studied at the Royal College of Arts in London.

She began writing poetry at a young age, and when she was still a teenager some of her poems were set to music by composer Samuel Coleridge-Taylor, who was a family friend.

Personal life
She was married to Columbus Kamba Simango, an East African teacher educated at Hampton Normal and Agricultural Institute and Columbia University.

Death
Kathleen Easmon died of appendicitis, aged 32, on 20 July 1924 at Charing Cross Hospital, London, England. Her obituary in The Times described her as "[o]ne of the most cultured women that West Africa has yet given the world".

Sources
M. C. F. Easmon, "A Nova Scotian Family", Eminent Sierra Leoneans in the nineteenth century (1961). 
Adell Patton, Jr., "Dr. John Farrell Easmon: Medical Professionalism and Colonial Racism in the Gold Coast, 1856–1900", The International Journal of African Historical Studies, Vol. 22, No. 4 (1989), pp. 601–636.
Adell Patton Jr., "The Easmon Episode", Physicians, Colonial Racism, and Diaspora in West Africa, pp. 93–122.

References

External links
 Easmon Family History

1891 births
1924 deaths
Sierra Leone Creole people
Kathleen Mary
Sierra Leonean people of African-American descent
Sierra Leoneans of Jamaican Maroon descent
Sierra Leonean people of Caribbean descent
Sierra Leonean people of Irish descent
Sierra Leonean people of British descent
People educated at Notting Hill & Ealing High School
MacCormac family of County Armagh, Northern Ireland
Deaths from appendicitis